Cathays Library is a Grade II* listed library building in Cathays, Cardiff, Wales. It is one of the 2,500 Carnegie libraries, financed by the American businessman Andrew Carnegie.

Location
The library is situated on the northern edge of Cathays at the junction of Crwys Road, Whitchurch Road and Fairoak Road, opposite Gladstone Primary School. It backs onto Cathays Cemetery.

History
Preceding the current library was a Cathays Branch Reading Room, which opened in May 1890. It initially contained 300 books and had an assistant librarian.

The current library was constructed between 1906–1907, though the panel above the main door is inscribed 1906. The building is in an Arts & Crafts Gothic style, designed by Cardiff architects Speir & Bevan. It has a generous single storey in a 'butterfly' plan, with two main wings parallel to Whitchurch Road and Fairoak Road. The front gable ends have large windows each divided into four lights. The building's central entrance section has a narrow octagonal tower above it, with a leaded spire.

It was designated in 1975 as a Grade II* listed building, as "an especially accomplished and well-preserved Arts and Crafts design" with a "pioneering butterfly plan".

At various points in the 21st century, Cathays Library has been threatened with closure, either due to reviews of the library services by Cardiff Council or claims of excessive repair costs. In 2003, 1000 people signed a petition to keep the library open. In autumn 2009, the library closed for repairs and refurbishment. £1 million was spent (including £300,000 for the Welsh Government) to remove dry rot and damp rot, clean the exterior and bring the interior up to modern standards. It reopened in June 2010.

Facilities
Following the library's reopening in 2010, the original reception desk was kept but with new modern furniture including moveable 'designer' shelving. The west wing of the building was reopened, having previously been closed following an arson attack. The library had 15 public computers and a small meeting room for up to 10 people. The building also has public toilets which had been restored. 

The library holds Cardiff's heritage and local studies collection. It also hosts history activities and community events. It is closed on Fridays and Sundays.

See also
Roath Library

References

External links
 Cathays Library page on cardiff.gov.uk

Arts and Crafts architecture in Wales
Carnegie libraries in Wales
Grade II* listed buildings in Cardiff
Grade II* listed library buildings
Library buildings completed in 1907
Public libraries in Cardiff
Library